The Hawthorn Memorial Trophy is an annual award honouring the achievements of a British or Commonwealth driver in Formula One motor racing. It was launched on 1 May 1959 by the Royal Automobile Club (RAC) as a memorial for Mike Hawthorn, a racing driver who retired immediately after becoming the first British Formula One World Drivers' Champion in the 1958 season as a result of the death of his teammate Peter Collins. The gilt and silver trophy, created by K. Lessons of the Goldsmiths Company in 1960, features chequered flags and the Union Flag and is mounted on a wooden pedestal. It is presented to the most successful British or Commonwealth driver of the previous year's Formula One World Championship. The winner was initially given the trophy at an annual ceremony held in the RAC's headquarters and club in London, but Motorsport UK currently presents it at the following year's British Grand Prix at Silverstone Circuit. The award is considered prestigious in the motor racing world.

The inaugural winner was the Australian driver Jack Brabham who won the 1959 championship. He went on to win the 1960 title, and thus, became the first competitor to retain the accolade. The first British winner was Stirling Moss for the 1961 season, and the inaugural recipient from New Zealand was Denny Hulme after winning the 1967 championship. The only Canadian recipient was Jacques Villeneuve following his championship victory in the 1997 season. The least successful winner over the course of a season was Jenson Button, who finished in ninth position in the 2005 standings. British racers have won the trophy fifty-two times, followed by Australians with seven victories, New Zealanders with three wins and one Canadian winner. Of the nineteen recipients, all but six have gone on to win the World Championship, with a total of 25 wins between them. The winner of the 2022 edition was George Russell, who finished fourth in that season's World Drivers' Championship.

Winners

Statistics

See also
 Lorenzo Bandini Trophy
 Motorsport in the United Kingdom

References

Formula One-related lists
Auto racing trophies and awards
Awards established in 1959
Motorsport in the United Kingdom